Birkenside is a village, adjacent to the A7 road, at the south of Gorebridge in Midlothian, Scotland.

See also
List of places in Midlothian
List of places in Scotland

References

External links

RCAHMS record for Gorebridge, Birkenside, Railway Footbridge
Village website

Villages in Midlothian